is a Japanese retired football player.

Club career

Tochigi SC
After nine seasons playing for Tochigi SC, Kan retired in December 2020.

Club statistics
Updated to 23 February 2018.

References

External links
Profile at Tochigi SC

1985 births
Living people
People from Imabari, Ehime
Kochi University alumni
Association football people from Ehime Prefecture
Japanese footballers
J2 League players
J3 League players
FC Gifu players
Tochigi SC players
Association football midfielders